Hicham El Gaoui is a Dutch-Moroccan kickboxer and K-1 fighter who competes in the cruiserweight division. Combat Press ranked him as a top ten middleweight kickboxer between November 2021 and March 2022, peaking at #4.

Titles
World Fighting League
 2015 WFL -84 kg Tournament Champion 

Enfusion
 2014 Enfusion Live World Champion -80 kg (1 Title Defence)

Tatneft Cup
 2012 Tatneft Arena World Cup 2012 Runner-up -80 kg

International Federation of Muaythai Associations
 2009 IFMA World Championships -81kg

Professional kickboxing record

|- bgcolor="#CCFFCC"
| 2019-11-02 || Win ||align=left| Boubaker El Bakouri || Enfusion Live 90  || Antwerp, Belgium || TKO || 3 || 
|- bgcolor="#CCFFCC"
| 2018-02-10 || Win ||align=left| Ulric Bokeme|| Enfusion Live || France || Decision|| 3 || 3:00
|- bgcolor="#FFBBBB"
| 2017-07-15 || Loss||align=left| Igor Bugaenko || ACB KB 10: Russia vs. China || Russia || Decision (Unanimous) || 3 || 3:00
|- bgcolor="#FFBBBB"
| 2017-05-06 || Loss||align=left| Vladimír Moravčík || Enfusion Live || Slovakia || Decision || 5 || 3:00
|- bgcolor="#CCFFCC"
| 2017-03-18 || Win ||align=left| Boubaker El Bakouri || Enfusion Live 47 & Kickboxing Talents 29 || Netherlands || Decision (Unanimous) || 3 || 3:00
|-
! style="background:white" colspan=9 | 
|-
|- bgcolor="#CCFFCC"
| 2017-03-18 || Win ||align=left| Joey Smits || Enfusion Live 47 & Kickboxing Talents 29 || Netherlands || TKO || 1 || 
|-
|- bgcolor="#FFBBBB"
| 2016-12-10 || Win ||align=left| Dmitry Valent|| Kunlun Fight 55 – 80 kg Tournament, Semi Finals || China || Decision  || 3 || 3:00
|- bgcolor="#CCFFCC"
| 2016-09-17 || Win ||align=left| Mehdi Bouanane|| Enfusion Live 41|| Belgium || TKO || 1 || 3:00
|-
|- bgcolor="#CCFFCC"
| 2016-06-04 || Win ||align=left| Rafael Carzola Pimentel || Enfusion Live 40  || Spain || TKO || 4 || 3:00
|-
|- bgcolor="#FFBBBB"
| 2015-11-21 || Loss ||align=left| Artur Kyshenko || Enfusion Live 34  || Groningen, Netherlands || Decision || 3 || 3:00
|-
|- bgcolor="#CCFFCC"
| 2015-04-12 || Win ||align=left| Ibrahim El Bouni || World Fighting League, Final || Hoofddorp, Netherlands || Decision || 3 || 3:00
|-
! style="background:white" colspan=9 | 
|-
|- bgcolor="#CCFFCC"
| 2015-04-12 || Win ||align=left| Sem Braan || World Fighting League, Semi Finals || Hoofddorp, Netherlands || Decision || 3 || 3:00
|-
|- bgcolor="#c5d2ea"
| 2015-03-28 || Draw ||align=left| Yücel Fidan || Fightersheart III  || Arnhem, Netherlands || Draw || 3 || 3:00
|-
|- bgcolor="#CCFFCC"
| 2015-03-14 || Win ||align=left| Karapet Karapetyan || Enfusion Live 25 || Turnhout, Belgium || Decision (Unanimous) || 5 || 3:00
|-
! style="background:white" colspan=9 | 
|-
|- bgcolor="#CCFFCC"
| 2014-11-29 || Win ||align=left| Masoud Rahimi || Fightsense VI  || The Hague, Netherlands || Decision || 3 || 3:00
|-
|- bgcolor= "#CCFFCC"
| 2014-09-20 ||Win ||align=left| Khalid El Bakouri || A1 World Combat Cup - Final 8, Super Fight (82 kg)|| Eindhoven, Netherlands || Decision|| 3|| 3:00
|-
|- bgcolor="#FFBBBB"
| 2014-06-12 || Loss ||align=left| Jiri Zak || Gibu Fight Night (86 kg) || Praha, Czech Republic || Decision (Majority) || 3 ||3:00
|-
|- bgcolor="#CCFFCC"
| 2014-05-17 || Win ||align=left| Ertugrul Bayrak || A1 World Combat Cup  || Eindhoven, Netherlands || KO ||  ||
|-
|- bgcolor="CCFFCC"
| 2014-04-05 || Win ||align=left| Andrii Panov || Enfusion Live 16 (85 kg)  || The Hague, Netherlands || KO || 2 ||
|-
|- bgcolor="#CCFFCC"
| 2014-03-22 || Win ||align=left| Aidan Brooks || Enfusion Live 15  || Eindhoven, Netherlands || TKO || 2 ||
|-
! style="background:white" colspan=9 | 
|-
|- bgcolor="#FFBBBB"
| 2013-03-30 || Loss ||align=left| Vladimir Idranyi || Tatneft Cup 2013 1st selection 1/4 final (-80 kg) || Nizhnekamsk, Russia || Decision (Unanimous) || 4 ||3:00
|-
|- bgcolor="#CCFFCC"
| 2013-02-23 || Win ||align=left| Anderson Arcanjo || Tatneft Cup 2013 4th selection 1/8 final (-80 kg) || Kazan, Russia || Decision (Unanimous) || 4 ||3:00
|-
|- bgcolor="#FFBBBB"
| 2012-12-01 || Loss||align=left| Boy Boy Martin || Fighters Heart  || Arnhem, Netherlands || TKO (Doc. Stop.) ||  ||
|-
|- bgcolor="#FFBBBB"
| 2012-10-20 || Loss ||align=left| Alexander Stetsurenko || Tatneft Arena World Cup 2012 final (80 kg) || Kazan, Russia || Decision (Unanimous) || 4 || 3:00
|-
! style="background:white" colspan=9 | 
|-
|- bgcolor="#CCFFCC"
| 2012-07-19 || Win ||align=left| Yordan Yankov || Tatneft Cup 2012 semi final (80 kg)|| Kazan, Russia || Decision (Unanimous) || 4 || 3:00
|-
|- bgcolor="#CCFFCC"
| 2012-06-02 || Win ||align=left| Vitaly Nikiforov || Tatneft Cup 2012 2nd selection 1/4 final (80 kg) || Kazan, Russia || Decision (Unanimous) || 4 ||3:00
|-
|- bgcolor= "#CCFFCC"
| 2012-04-05 || Win ||align=left| Konstantin Gorokhov || Tatneft Cup 2012 4th selection 1/8 final || Kazan, Russia || RTD || 2 ||
|-
|- bgcolor= "#CCFFCC"
| 2012-02-26 || Win  ||align=left| Masoud Rahimi || Vuisten Van Vuur  || 's-Hertogenbosch, Netherlands || Decision) || 3 || 3.00
|-
|- bgcolor="#CCFFCC"
| 2011-11-12 || Win ||align=left| Alexander Stetsurenko || Tatneft Cup 2011 Final (80 kg)|| Kazan, Russia  || Decision (Unanimous) || 3 || 3:00
|-
|- bgcolor="#CCFFCC"
| 2011-10-16 || Win ||align=left| L'houcine Ouzgni || Beverwijk Top Team Gala  || Beverwijk, Netherlands || Decision ||  ||
|-
|- bgcolor="#CCFFCC"
| 2011-05-21 || Win||align=left| Dany Bill || Le Choc Des Legéndes || Saint Ouen, France || Decision (Unanimous) || 3 || 3:00
|- bgcolor="#CCFFCC"
| 2011-05-08 || Win ||align=left| Amin Chakoud || Veni Vidi Vici 3 || Veenendaal, Netherlands  || Decision || 3 || 3:00
|-
|- bgcolor="#CCFFCC"
| 2010-04-10 || Win ||align=left| Ali Cenik || Star Muay Fight Night || Maastricht, Netherlands || Decision || 2 ||
|-
|- bgcolor="#CCFFCC"
| 2010-03-28 || Win ||align=left| Alexandros Nikoladis || Spartan Warriors 3 || Athens, Greece || Decision || 3 || 3:00
|-
|- bgcolor="#CCFFCC"
| 2009-03-29 || Win ||align=left| Sahak Parparyan || The Outland Rumble III || Rotterdam, Netherlands || Decision || 5 || 3:00
|-
|- bgcolor="#CCFFCC" 
| 2008-05-18 || Win ||align=left| Errol Koning || Masters of the Ring, Zonnehuis  || Amsterdam, Netherlands || RTD || 4 || 2:00
|-
| colspan=9 | Legend:    
|-

See also
List of male kickboxers

References

External links
 Profile at Fightlife

Living people
Dutch male kickboxers
Moroccan male kickboxers
Dutch Muay Thai practitioners
Moroccan Muay Thai practitioners
Dutch sportspeople of Moroccan descent
Kunlun Fight kickboxers
Year of birth missing (living people)